Walter John Alsford (6 November 1911 – 3 June 1968) was an English footballer who played for Tottenham Hotspur and Nottingham Forest, as well as the English national side.

References

External links
Player profile at EnglandStats.com

1911 births
1968 deaths
English footballers
England international footballers
Tottenham Hotspur F.C. players
Nottingham Forest F.C. players
Footballers from Edmonton, London
English Football League players
Association football wing halves